St. Ignatius High School may refer to:

Saint Ignatius School, Wentworth, New South Wales, Australia
St. Ignatius School, Winnipeg, Manitoba, Canada
St. Ignatius High School (Thunder Bay), Thunder Bay, Ontario, Canada
St. Ignatius High School (Mahalakshmi), Mumbai, India
St. Ignatius High School MRT station, Taipei, Taiwan
St. Ignatius College Preparatory, San Francisco, California, U.S.
St. Ignatius College Prep, Chicago, Illinois, U.S.
Saint Ignatius High School (Cleveland), Cleveland, Ohio, U.S.

See also
St. Ignatius' Convent Higher Secondary School, Palayamkottai, Tirunelveli, India
St. Ignatius of Loyola Catholic Secondary School, Oakville, Ontario
St. Ignatius Catholic School (disambiguation)
Saint Ignatius College (disambiguation)
Saint Ignatius of Loyola
Saint Ignatius of Antioch
Saint Ignatius of Constantinople
St. Ignatius (disambiguation)
Loyola (disambiguation)
Ignatius Gymnasium, Catholic high school in Amsterdam, North Holland, Netherlands